Turkish Underwater Sports Federation (TSSF) is the governing body for both underwater sports and lifesaving in Turkey. Founded in 1982 and based in Ankara, the TSSF is a member of both the Confédération Mondiale des Activités Subaquatiques (CMAS) and the International Life Saving Federation (ILS).   Its president is Ahmet İnkılap Obruk, who was also elected in 2009 to CMAS' board of directors for a term of four years.

Organization 
Currently, the TSSF oversees following ten activities and sports branches:
 Life saving
 Scuba diving
 Underwater target shooting
 Finswimming
 Apnea
 Underwater photography and videography
 Underwater hockey
 Underwater orienteering
 Underwater rugby
 Spearfishing

The federation operates a number of training centers for diving and life saving across the country. There are decompression chambers in eleven cities of Turkey available for use also by TSSF members.

International diving certificate
The diving certification of CMAS* SCUBA Diver issued by the federation upon completion of a study course at one of its training centers is internationally recognized.

Notable sportspeople
 Orhan Aytür (born 1965), 2011 World champion in underwater photography
 Yasemin Dalkılıç (born 1979), World record holder female free-diver
 Şahika Ercümen (born 1985), World record holder female free-diver
 Devrim Cenk Ulusoy (born 1973), World record holder free-diver

References

Sports organizations established in 1982
1982 establishments in Turkey
Organizations based in Ankara
Underwater sports
Diver organizations
Underwater sports organizations
Lifesaving organizations
Recreational diving
Finswimming
Freediving
Underwater hockey governing bodies
Underwater orienteering
Underwater rugby
Water sports in Turkey
Federation